Middleton High School is a four-year public secondary school in Middleton, Idaho, United States, the only traditional high school in Middleton School District #134.

Middleton High School fire
On the morning of February 1, 2007, the school caught fire as a result of the boiler exploding. Seventy percent of the school was ruined, with the damages assessed at $10 million. The 42-year-old school was full of trophies, plaques, memorabilia, and photographs. The band room alone contained $200,000 in instruments, including the associated middle school's instruments. The fire did not result in any deaths.

Rebuild after fire
Construction on the new Middleton High School was completed in July 2008. The school reopened with seventeen teaching stations, a reduction of two classrooms, with the money saved used for improvements to the library, music room, and band room and upgrades throughout the building.

New school and location 
The district chose the  site for the new high school on the southeast corner of Willis and Emmett Roads and purchased it at $10,000 per acre, thus making the entire purchase cost $600,000. In fall of 2011 classes began at the newly constructed , two-story high school. Located approximately 2½ miles from the old high school, the new facility is nearly five times the size of the old building. The new facility includes many tech, safety, and athletic additions to improve functionality. The new facility includes 34 classrooms (14 of which are unused), each with its own dedicated smart board, projector, and panic buttons. One hundred and ten security cameras adorn the 60-acre campus inside and out. The main entrance to the building features a "safety door" which makes guests check in through a window before being buzzed into the building.

The newly built school includes a new fine arts center with a 900-seat auditorium, which includes full lighting, sound, and an orchestra pit. The choir, orchestra, and band rooms were all built to specifically enhance the quality and clarity of the music being played.

When designing the new facility administrators choose to also greatly enhance the athletics facilities, in hopes to host tournaments, championships, and meet-ups. The new two-story, 3,000-seat gym features a full-size regulatory basketball court with two auxiliary courts located on the second floor behind the set of bleachers. The entire gym is encircled by a second-story, three-lane track totaling a quarter of a mile. The football stadium has the capacity to hold 4,000 spectators with press boxes adorning either side of the field. Instead of grass, the field is artificial turf with the school, logo and name. Both the softball and baseball fields feature pro-style recessed dugout with net backstops. A full-sized soccer field is surrounded by berm-style seating and a press box. The new campus also features eight full-sized tennis courts.

In addition to the main two-story building, there is also a separate Vo-ag education center. This building features classrooms built for wood shop, metal shop, engine repair, and a greenhouse.

In addition to the 2,000-student capacity, the campus has nearly 1,300 parking spots.

Bands
Middleton has three bands: jazz band, concert band, and marching band. The jazz band plays various jazz works and rock/pop songs. The concert band plays classical music pieces and performs for Halloween and Christmas concerts, then a festival concert in the spring, and also performs at all home girls'/boys' basketball games under the pep band. The marching band was formed in 2004 and has played music from Pirates of the Caribbean, The Incredibles, Grease, and Rise From The Ashes. The 2008 show was titled Chicago On Broadway, and the 2009 show was Fantasmic. In the fire of 2007, all of the music that had been collected for many years and all the instruments were destroyed.

Athletics
Middleton competes in athletics in IHSAA Class 5A in the Southern Idaho Conference.

State titles
Boys
 Soccer (1): fall (3A) 2005 (introduced in 2000)
 Basketball (2): (A-3, now 2A) 1965, (4A)2021
 Golf (7): (B) 1976, 1977, 1986, 1987, 1991, 1992, 1993 (introduced in 1956)

Girls
 Volleyball (1): fall (3A) 2005 (introduced in 1976)
 Basketball (5): (4A) 2008, 2010, 2011, 2012, 2017 (introduced in 1976)
 Softball (3): (3A) 2004, 2005, (4A) 2016 (introduced in 1997)
 Track (1): (3A) 2006 (introduced in 1971)
 Golf (1): (4A) 2009 (introduced in 1987)

Notable alumni
Carlos Trujillo, long-distance runner
Melinda Smyser, Idaho politician

References

External links
 
 Middleton School District #134
 Viking Bands Website

Public high schools in Idaho
Schools in Canyon County, Idaho
Treasure Valley
1965 establishments in Idaho